Angliers is the name of the following places:

 Angliers, Charente-Maritime, a commune in the Charente-Maritime department of France
 Angliers, Vienne, a commune in the Vienne department of France
 Angliers, Quebec, a village in Quebec, Canada